Weitzel is a surname. Notable people with the surname include:

August Willem Philip Weitzel (1816–1896), military officer, Dutch Minister of War,
Fritz Weitzel (1904–1940), German SS commander during the Nazi era
George T. Weitzel (1873–1936), Envoy Extraordinary and Minister Plenipotentiary to Nicaragua
Godfrey Weitzel (1835–1884), German-American major general in the Union army during the American Civil War
Hedwig Weitzel or Hedwig Ross (1900–1971), New Zealand-born Australian educator and political activist
John Quinn Weitzel M.M. (1928-2022), American Roman Catholic bishop of Samoa-Pago Pago, American Samoa
Louise Adeline Weitzel (1862–1934), American writer of German descent
Willi Weitzel (born 1972), German television presenter, journalist and film producer

See also
Weitzel Lock, parallel locks that enable ships to travel between Lake Superior and the lower Great Lakes
Weitz
Wetzel (disambiguation)
Wetzell
Witzel (disambiguation)

German-language surnames